The Holmesdale Building Society was a single-branch UK building society based in Reigate, Surrey.

It ceased to exist on October 1, 2018, taken over by the much larger Skipton Building Society, and the Reigate branch became a branch of the Skipton.

It was a member of the Building Societies Association. The society had been in existence since 1855, making it one of the UK's longest established Building Societies. Over much of its history the members were mainly local people, but in later years it had members in many parts of the country.

Founded by Thomas Buckland, one of Reigate's most progressive 19th century entrepreneurs, the Holmesdale was controlled by the Buckland family until David W. Buckland retired from the post of Chief Executive in the late 1970s.

Because the Society was formed before 1874 it was an unincorporated Building Society until the 1950s when it eventually became an incorporated Building Society.

References

External links
Skipton Building Society - Holmesdale merger (Skipton Building Society website, with details about the takeover)
Holmesdale Building Society (the Holmesdale website no longer exists; this link now points to the Skipton home page)
Building Societies Association

Former building societies of the United Kingdom
Banks established in 1855
Organizations established in 1855
Banks disestablished in 2018
Organisations based in Surrey
1855 establishments in England